This is list of the Places of Scenic Beauty of Japan located within the Prefecture of Hyōgo.

National Places of Scenic Beauty
As of 1 July 2020, nine Places have been designated at a national level.

Prefectural Places of Scenic Beauty
As of 1 April 2020, nineteen Places have been designated at a prefectural level.

Municipal Places of Scenic Beauty
As of 1 May 2019, forty-two Places have been designated at a municipal level.

Registered Places of Scenic Beauty
As of 1 July 2020, five Monuments have been registered (as opposed to designated) as Places of Scenic Beauty at a national level.

See also
 Cultural Properties of Japan
 List of parks and gardens of Hyōgo Prefecture
 List of Historic Sites of Japan (Hyōgo)

References

External links
  Cultural Properties of Hyōgo Prefecture

Tourist attractions in Hyōgo Prefecture
Places of Scenic Beauty

ja:Category:兵庫県にある国指定の名勝